Valsa kunzei is a plant pathogen infecting Douglas-firs.

See also
 List of Douglas-fir diseases

References

External links
 USDA ARS Fungal Database

Fungal tree pathogens and diseases
Diaporthales
Fungi described in 1846
Taxa named by Theodor Rudolph Joseph Nitschke